Maya stelae (singular stela) are monuments that were fashioned by the Maya civilization of ancient Mesoamerica. They consist of tall, sculpted stone shafts and are often associated with low circular stones referred to as altars, although their actual function is uncertain. Many stelae were sculpted in low relief, although plain monuments are found throughout the Maya region. The sculpting of these monuments spread throughout the Maya area during the Classic Period (250–900 AD), and these pairings of sculpted stelae and circular altars are considered a hallmark of Classic Maya civilization. The earliest dated stela to have been found in situ in the Maya lowlands was recovered from the great city of Tikal in Guatemala. During the Classic Period almost every Maya kingdom in the southern lowlands raised stelae in its ceremonial centre.

Stelae became closely associated with the concept of divine kingship and declined at the same time as this institution. The production of stelae by the Maya had its origin around 400 BC and continued through to the end of the Classic Period, around 900, although some monuments were reused in the Postclassic (c. 900–1521). The major city of Calakmul in Mexico raised the greatest number of stelae known from any Maya city, at least 166, although they are very poorly preserved.

Hundreds of stelae have been recorded in the Maya region, displaying a wide stylistic variation. Many are upright slabs of limestone sculpted on one or more faces, with available surfaces sculpted with figures carved in relief and with hieroglyphic text. Stelae in a few sites display a much more three-dimensional appearance where locally available stone permits, such as at Copán and Toniná. Plain stelae do not appear to have been painted nor overlaid with stucco decoration, but most Maya stelae were probably brightly painted in red, yellow, black, blue and other colours.

Stelae were essentially stone banners raised to glorify the king and record his deeds, although the earliest examples depict mythological scenes. Imagery developed throughout the Classic Period, with Early Classic stelae (c. 250–600) displaying non-Maya characteristics from the 4th century onwards, with the introduction of imagery linked to the central Mexican metropolis of Teotihuacan. This influence receded in the 5th century although some minor Teotihuacan references continued to be used. In the late 5th century, Maya kings began to use stelae to mark the end of calendrical cycles. In the Late Classic (c. 600–900), imagery linked to the Mesoamerican ballgame was introduced, once again displaying influence from central Mexico. By the Terminal Classic, the institution of divine kingship declined, and Maya kings began to be depicted with their subordinate lords. As the Classic Period came to an end, stelae ceased to be erected, with the last known examples being raised in 909–910.

Function
The function of the Maya stela was central to the ideology of Maya kingship from the very beginning of the Classic Period through to the very end of the Terminal Classic (800–900). The hieroglyphic inscriptions on the stelae of the Classic period site of Piedras Negras played a key part in the decipherment of the script, with stelae being grouped around seven different structures and each group appearing to chart the life of a particular individual, with key dates being celebrated, such as birth, marriage and military victories. From these stelae, epigrapher Tatiana Proskouriakoff was able to identify that they contained details of royal rulers and their associates, rather than priests and gods as had previously been theorised.

Epigrapher David Stuart first proposed that the Maya regarded their stelae as te tun, "stone trees", although he later revised his reading to lakamtun, meaning "banner stone", from lakam meaning "banner" in several Mayan languages and tun meaning "stone". According to Stuart this may refer to the stelae as stone versions of vertical standards that once stood in prominent places in Maya city centres, as depicted in ancient Maya graffiti. The name of the modern Lacandon Maya is likely to be a Colonial corruption of this word.

Maya stelae were often arranged to impress the viewer, forming lines or other arrangements within the ceremonial centre of the city. Maya cities with a history of stonecarving that extended back into the Early Classic preferred to pair their stelae with a circular altar, which may have represented a cut tree trunk and have been used to perform human sacrifice, given the prevalence of sacrificial imagery on such monuments. An alternative interpretation of these "altars" is that they were in fact thrones that were used by rulers during ceremonial events. Archaeologists believe that they probably also served as ritual pedestals for incense burners, ceremonial fires and other offerings.

The core purpose of a stela was to glorify the king. Many Maya stelae depict only the king of the city, and describe his actions with hieroglyphic script. Even when the individual depicted is not the king himself, the text or scene usually relates the subject to the king. Openly declaring the importance and power of the king to the community, the stela portrayed his wealth, prestige and ancestry, and depicted him wielding the symbols of military and divine power. Stelae were raised to commemorate important events, especially at the end of a kʼatun 20-year cycle of the Maya calendar, or to mark a quarter or a half kʼatun. The stela did not just mark off a period of time; it has been argued that it physically embodied that period of time. The hieroglyphic texts on the stelae describe how some of the calendrical ceremonies required the king to perform ritual dance and bloodletting. At Tikal, the twin pyramid groups were built to celebrate the kʼatun ending and reflected Maya cosmology. These groups possessed pyramids on the east and west sides that represented the birth and death of the sun. On the south side, a nine-doored building was situated in order to represent the underworld. On the north side was a walled enclosure that represented the celestial region; it was left open to the sky. It was in this celestial enclosure that a stela-altar pair was placed, the altar being a fitting throne for the divine king. Calakmul practised a tradition that was unusual in the Maya area, that of raising twin stelae depicting both the king and his wife.

The iconography of stelae remained reasonably stable during the Classic Period, since the effectiveness of the propaganda message of the monument relied upon its symbolism being clearly recognisable to the viewer. However, at times a shift in the sociopolitical climate induced a change in iconography. Stelae were an ideal format for public propaganda since, unlike earlier architectural sculpture, they were personalised to a specific king, could be arranged in public spaces and were portable, allowing them to be moved and reset in a new location. An important feature of stelae was that they were able to survive different phases of architectural construction, unlike architectural sculpture itself. With the ability to portray an identifiable ruler bearing elite goods, accompanied by hieroglyphic text and carrying out actions in service of the kingdom, stelae became one of the most effective ways of delivering public propaganda in the Maya lowlands. As well as marking the boundary, they defined the sacred geometry of the city and referred to important seats of deities in the ceremonial centre of the Copán.

Ritual significance

Stelae were considered to be invested with holiness and, perhaps, even to contain a divine soul-like essence that almost made them living beings. Some were apparently given individual names in hieroglyphic texts and were considered to be participants in rituals conducted at their location. Such rituals in the Classic Period appear to have included a kʼaltun binding ritual, in which the stela was wrapped in bands of tied cloth. This ritual was closely tied to the kʼatun-ending calendrical ceremony. A kʼaltun ritual is depicted carved onto a peccary skull deposited as a funerary offering at Copán, the scene shows two nobles flanking a stela-altar pair where the stela seems to have been bound with cloth. The act of wrapping or binding a sacred object was of considerable religious importance across Mesoamerica, and is well attested among the Maya right up to the present day. The precise meaning of the act is not clear, but may be to protect the bound object or to contain its sacred essence. The binding of stelae may be linked to the modern Kʼicheʼ Maya practice of wrapping small divinatory stones in a bundle.

A stela was not just considered a neutral portrait, it was considered to be 'owned' by the subject, whether that subject was a person or a god. Stela 3 from El Zapote in Guatemala is a small monument dating from the Early Classic period, the front of the stela bears a portrait of the rain god Yaxhal Chaak, "Clear Water Chaak". The accompanying text describes how the deity Yaxhal Chaak himself was dedicated, not just his image on the stela. This could be taken to imply that the stela was seen as the embodiment of the deity and is also true of those stelae bearing royal portraits, which were seen to be the supernatural embodiment of the ruler they represented. The stela, combined with any accompanying altar, was a perpetual enactment of royal ceremony in stone.  David Stuart has stated that stelae "do not simply commemorate past events and royal ceremonies but serve to perpetuate the ritual act into eternity", thus ascribing a magical effectiveness to stela depictions. In the same vein, stelae bearing royal portraits may have been magically loaded extensions of the royal person (uba 'his self'), extremely powerful confirmations of political and religious authority. Stelae bearing images of multiple people, for instance of several nobles performing a ritual or of a king with his war captives, were likely to be exceptions to this idea of the stela as sacred embodiment of the subject.

At times, when a new king came to power, old stelae would be respectfully buried and replaced with new ones, or they might be broken. When a Maya city was invaded by a rival, it was pillaged by the victors. One of the most striking archaeological markers of such an invasion is the destruction of the defeated city's stelae, which were broken and cast down. At the end of the Preclassic, around 150 AD, this fate appears to have befallen the important city of El Mirador, where most of the stelae were found smashed.

Manufacture

Royal artisans were sometimes responsible for sculpting stelae; in some cases these sculptors were actually the sons of kings. In other cases it is likely that captive artisans from defeated cities were put to work raising stelae for the victors, as evidenced by the sculptural style of one city appearing upon monuments of its conqueror soon after its defeat. This appears to have been the case in Piedras Negras where Stela 12 depicting war captives submitting to the victorious king is carved in the style of Pomoná, the defeated city. Archaeologists believe that this may also have been the case with Quiriguá after its surprise defeat of its overlord Copán.

Stelae were usually crafted from quarried limestone, although in the Southern Maya area other types of stone were preferred. Volcanic tuff was used at Copán to craft their stelae in three dimensions. Both limestone and tuff were easily worked when first quarried and hardened with exposure to the elements. At Quiriguá a hard red sandstone was used that was unable to reproduce the three-dimensionality of Copán but was of sufficient strength that the kings of the city were able to raise the tallest free-standing stone monuments in the Americas. The Maya lacked beasts of burden and did not employ the wheel; therefore the freshly quarried blocks of stone had to be transported on rollers along the Maya causeways. Evidence of this has been found on the causeways themselves, where rollers have been recovered. The blocks were sculpted to their final form while still soft and they then hardened naturally with time. Stone was usually quarried locally but was occasionally transported over great distances. Calakmul in Mexico was one of two powerful cities that shaped the political landscape of the Classic Period, the other being Tikal. Although Calakmul raised the greatest number of stelae known from any Maya city, they were sculpted from poor quality limestone and have suffered severe erosion, rendering most of them illegible. Stelae could be of substantial size; Quiriguá Stela E measures  from the base to the top, including the  buried portion holding it in place.

Maya stelae were worked with stone chisels and probably with wooden mallets. Hammerstones were fashioned from flint and basalt and were used for shaping the softer rocks used to make stelae, while fine detail was completed with smaller chisels. Originally most were probably brightly painted in red, yellow, black, blue and other colours using mineral and organic pigments. At Copán and some other Maya cities, some traces of these pigments were found upon the monuments.

Generally all sides of a stela were sculpted with human figures and hieroglyphic text, with each side forming a part of a single composition. Undecorated stelae in the form of plain slabs or columns of stone are found throughout the Maya region. These appear never to have been painted or to have been decorated with overlaid stucco sculpture.

History

Preclassic origins

The Maya sculptural tradition that produced the stelae emerged fully formed and had probably been preceded by sculpted wooden monuments. However the tradition of raising stelae had its origin elsewhere in Mesoamerica, among the Olmecs of the Gulf Coast of Mexico. In the Late Preclassic it then spread into the Isthmus of Tehuantepec and southwards along the Pacific Coast to sites such as Chiapa de Corzo, Izapa and Takalik Abaj where Mesoamerican Long Count calendar dates began to be carved onto the stelae. Although at Izapa the stelae depicted mythological scenes, at Takalik Abaj they began to show rulers in Early Classic Maya posture accompanied by calendrical dates and hieroglyphic texts. It was also at Takalik Abaj and Izapa that these stelae began to be paired with circular altars. By approximately 400 BC, near the end of the Middle Preclassic Period, early Maya rulers were raising stelae that celebrated their achievements and validated their right to rule. At El Portón in the Salamá Valley of highland Guatemala a carved schist stela (Monument 1) was erected, the badly eroded hieroglyphs appear to be a very early form of Maya writing and may even be the earliest known example of Maya script. It was associated with a plain altar in a typical stela-altar pairing that would become common across the Maya area. Stela 11 from Kaminaljuyu, a major Preclassic highland city, dates to the Middle Preclassic and is the earliest stela to depict a standing ruler. The sculpted Preclassic stelae from Kaminaljuyu and other cities in the region, such as Chalchuapa in El Salvador and Chocolá in the Pacific lowlands, tend to depict political succession, sacrifice and warfare.

These early stelae depicted rulers as warriors or wearing the masks and headdresses of Maya deities, accompanied by texts that recorded dates and achievements during their reigns, as well as recording their relationships with their ancestors. Stelae came to be displayed in large ceremonial plazas designed to display these monuments to maximum effect. The raising of stelae spread from the Pacific Coast and adjacent highlands throughout the Maya area. The development of Maya stelae coincides with the development of divine kingship among the Classic Maya. In the southern Maya area, the Late Preclassic stelae impressed upon the viewer the achievements of the king and his right to rule, thus reinforcing both his political and religious power.

At the Middle Preclassic city of Nakbe in the central lowlands, Maya sculptors were producing some of the earliest lowland Maya stelae, depicting richly dressed individuals. Nakbe Stela 1 has been dated to around 400 BC. It was broken into pieces, but originally represented two elaborately dressed figures facing each other, and perhaps represents the transference of power from one ruler to his successor, however it also has features that recall the myth of the Maya Hero Twins, and would be the earliest known presentation of them. Around 200 BC the enormous nearby city of El Mirador had started to erect stela-like monuments, bearing inscriptions that appear to be glyphs but that are so far unreadable. Stela dating to the Late Preclassic period are also known from the sites of El Tintal, Cival, and San Bartolo in Guatemala, and Actuncan and Cahal Pech in Belize.

On the Pacific Coast El Baúl Stela 1 features a date in its hieroglyphic text that equates to 36 AD. It depicts a ruler bearing a sceptre or a spear with a double column of hieroglyphic text before him. At Takalik Abaj are two stelae (Stela 2 and Stela 5) depicting the transfer of power from one ruler to another; they both show two elaborately dressed figures facing each other with a column of hieroglyphic text between them. The Long Count date on Stela 2 dates it to the 1st century BC at the latest, while Stela 5 has two dates, the latest of which is 126 AD. The stela was associated with the burial of a human sacrifice and other offerings. Stela 13 at Takalik Abaj also dates to the Late Preclassic; a massive offering of more than 600 ceramic vessels was found at its base, together with 33 obsidian prismatic blades and other artefacts. Both the stela and the offering were associated with a nearby Late Preclassic royal tomb. At Cuello in Belize, a plain stela was raised around 100 AD in an open plaza.

At the very end of the Preclassic Period, around 100–300 AD, cities in the highlands and along the Pacific Coast ceased to raise sculpted stelae bearing hieroglyphic texts. This cessation in the production of stelae was the most dramatic symptom of a general decline in the region at this time. This decline has been linked to the intrusion of peoples from the western highlands combined with the disastrous eruption of the Ilopango Volcano that severely affected the entire region.

Early Classic

In the central Petén lowlands, the rise of individual rule at cities like Tikal required the development of new forms of public imagery. Preclassic imagery had involved largely anonymous, impersonal sculpture as an architectural element. The existing Preclassic Petén styles of architectural sculpture were combined with features of the highland and Pacific Coast tradition to produce the Early Classic Maya stela. Features formerly found on architectural sculpture, such as the giant masks adorning Preclassic pyramids, were adapted for use on stelae. For example, the so-called "Jester God" was transferred to the headdress of the ruler portrayed on Tikal Stela 29, which bears the oldest Long Count date yet found in the Maya lowlands – equating to 292 AD. At some Maya cities the first appearance of stelae corresponded with the foundation of dynastic rule.

The standard form of the Maya stela incorporating art, calendrical dates and hieroglyphic text onto a royal monument only began to be erected in the Maya lowlands after 250 AD. The late 4th century saw the introduction of non-Maya imagery linked to the giant metropolis of Teotihuacan in the Valley of Mexico. This foreign influence is seen at Tikal, Uaxactun, Río Azul and El Zapote, all in the Petén Department of Guatemala. At Tikal this was initiated by the king Yax Nuun Ayiin I, from there it spread to his vassal cities. In the 5th century, this strongly Teotihuacan-linked imagery was abandoned by Yax Nuun Ayiin I's son Siyaj Chan Kʼawiil II, who reintroduced imagery associated with the Pacific Coast and adjacent highlands. Minor references to Teotihuacan continued, for example in the form of Teotihuacan war emblems. His Stela 31 was originally erected in 445 but was later broken from its butt and was found buried in the city centre, almost directly above his tomb. It depicts the crowning of Siyaj Chan Kʼawiil II, with his father hovering above him as a supernatural being and is executed in traditional Maya style. On the sides of the stela are carved two portraits of his father in a non-Maya style, dressed as a Teotihuacan warrior, bearing the central Mexican atlatl spear-thrower not adopted by the Maya, and carrying a shield adorned with the face of the Mexican god Tlaloc. The reverse of the stela bears a lengthy hieroglyphic inscription detailing the history of Tikal, including the Teotihuacan invasion that established Yax Nuun Ayiin I and his dynasty.

In the Early Classic period the Maya kings began to dedicate a new stela, or other monument, to mark the end of each kʼatun cycle (representing 7,200 days, just under 20 sidereal years). At Tikal, the first to do so was king Kan Chitam who ruled in the late 5th century. Stela 9 from the city is the first dated monument raised to mark off a period of time, it was raised in 475.

Late Classic

In the Late Classic the sculpted images of rulers on stelae remained much the same as in the Early Classic, appearing in profile in the foreground and filling almost the entire available space, which is delimited by a frame. Imagery associated with the Mesoamerican ballgame started to appear in the Maya lowlands in the Late Classic Period. Maya kings are depicted as warriors wearing costume from the Mexican highlands, including elements such as the foreign god Tlaloc and the Teotihacan serpent. Such imagery appears in the Late Classic on stelae from Naranjo, Piedras Negras and the Petexbatún cities of Dos Pilas and Aguateca. At Dos Pilas, a pair of stelae represent the king of the city in costume forming a jaguar and eagle pairing, characteristic of the Mexican warrior cult. Stelae were being erected by the Maya across the entire central and southern Maya lowlands by 790, an area that encompassed .

In the north, Coba on the eastern side of the Yucatán Peninsula raised at least 23 large stelae. Although badly eroded their style and texts link them to cities from the Petén Basin. At the southern periphery of the Maya region, Copán developed a new high-relief style of stelae and in 652 the twelfth king Chan Imix Kʼawiil arranged a series of these stelae to define the sacred geometry of the city, and to celebrate his royal rule and his ancestors. His son and successor Uaxaclajuun Ubʼaah Kʼawiil further developed this new high-relief style of sculpture and erected a series of intricately decorated stelae in the city's Great Plaza that brought the carving of stelae close to full in-the-round three-dimensional sculpture. Both of these kings focused on their own images on their stelae and emphasised their place in the dynastic sequence to justify their rule, possibly linked to a break in the dynastic sequence with the death of the eleventh king of Copán.

After Quiriguá defeated its overlord Copán in 738, it brought massive blocks of red sandstone from quarries  from the city and sculpted a series of enormous stelae that were the biggest monolithic monuments ever raised by the Maya. These stelae were shaped into a square cross-section and were decorated on all four faces. These stelae usually bear two images of the Quiriguá king, on the front and the back, in a lower relief than that found at Copán. They feature highly complex panels of hieroglyphic text that are among the most skillfully executed of all Maya inscriptions in stone. The stelae have weathered well and display fine precision on the part of the sculptors.

Terminal Classic

The decline in the erection of stelae is linked to the decline in the institution of divine kingship, which began in the Late Preclassic. Originally the stelae depicted the king with symbols of power, sometimes standing over defeated enemies and occasionally accompanied by his wives or his heir. By the Terminal Classic, kings were sharing stelae with subordinate lords, who also played a prominent role in the events depicted. This reflected a decentralisation of power and the bargaining between high-ranking nobles so that the king could maintain power, but led to a progressive weakening of the king's rule. As the position of the king became weaker and that of his vassals and subordinates became stronger, the latter began to erect their own stelae, a function that was formerly the exclusive preserve of the king himself. Some of these subordinates broke away to form their own petty states, but even this did not last and they also ceased to erect monuments.

In the Pasión River region of Petén, rulers began to be portrayed as ballplayers on stelae. Seibal was the first site in the region to depict its rulers thus. Seventeen stelae were erected at Seibal between 849 and 889, and show a mix of Maya and foreign styles, including a lord wearing the beaked mask of Ehecatl, the central Mexican wind god, with a Mexican-style speech scroll emerging from the mouth. Some of these have a stylistic affinity with the painted murals at Cacaxtla, a non-Maya site in the central Mexican state of Tlaxcala. This hybrid style seems to indicate that the kings of Seibal were Maya lords adapting to changing political conditions by adopting a mix of symbols originating from both lowland Maya and central Mexican sources. Some of the more foreign-looking stelae even bear non-Maya calendrical glyphs. Stelae at Oxkintok, to the north in the Puuc region of the Yucatán Peninsula, divided the face of the stela into up to three levels, each of which contained a different scene, usually of a lone figure that could be either male or female. The representation of the human figure differed from the formal treatment in the south, and were simplified, coarse representations lacking individuality amongst sociopolitical and religious symbols.

As the Classic Maya collapse swept across the Maya region, city after city ceased to erect stelae recording its dynastic achievements. At the important city of Calakmul, two stelae were raised in 800 and three more in 810, but these were the last and the city fell into silence. At Oxkintok the last stela was raised in 859. Stela 11, dated to 869, was the last monument to ever be erected at the once great city of Tikal. The last known Maya stelae bearing a Long Count calendrical date are Toniná Monument 101, which was erected in 909 to mark the kʼatun ending that year, and Stela 6 from Itzimté, dated to 910.

Postclassic
At Copán ritual offerings were deposited around the city's stelae until at least 1000, which may represent the offerings of a surviving elite that still remembered its ancestors, or may be due to highland Maya still regarding the city as a place of pilgrimage long after it had fallen into ruin. A small number of sculpted stelae once stood at Cerro Quiac in the Guatemalan Highlands, and are presumed to have been erected by Mam Maya in the 13th or 14th century. At Lamanai in Belize, Classic period stelae were repositioned upon two small Postclassic platforms dating to the 15th or 16th century. At La Milpa, also in Belize, at around the time of Spanish contact in the late 16th century a tiny remnant Maya population started to make offerings of Conquest-period pottery to stelae, perhaps in an effort to invoke the ancestors to help resist the Spanish onslaught. A plain stela in Twin Pyramid Group R at Tikal was removed by the local inhabitants some time during the Postclassic; its accompanying altar was also moved but abandoned some distance from its original location. Some plain stelae were raised at Topoxté in the Petén Lakes region of Guatemala in the Postclassic; these were perhaps covered in stucco and painted. This may represent a revival of the katun-ending ceremonies that occurred in the Classic Period, and reflected ties with the northern Yucatán.

Discovery
One of the earliest accounts of Maya stelae comes from Diego Garcia de Palacio, a Spanish colonial official who described six of the stelae at Copán in a letter to king Philip II of Spain written in 1576. Juan Galindo, governor of Petén, visited Copán in 1834 and noted the sculpted high-relief stelae there. Five years later, American diplomat John Lloyd Stephens and British artist Frederick Catherwood arrived in war-torn Central America and set out for Copán, describing fifteen stelae in Stephens' Incidents of Travel in Central America, Chiapas and Yucatán, published in 1841. Stephens and Catherwood noticed the presence of red pigment on some of the Copán stelae. Stephens unsuccessfully attempted to buy the ruins of Quiriguá, and purchased Copán for US$50 ($  in ) with the idea of shipping the stelae to New York for display in a new museum. In the event, he was prevented from shipping the monuments down the Copán River by the discovery of impassable rapids and all the stelae remained at the site. While Stephens was engaged on business elsewhere, Catherwood carried out a brief investigation of the stelae at Quiriguá but found them very difficult to draw without a camera lucida due to their great height. Ambrosio Tut, governor of Petén, and colonel Modesto Méndez, the chief magistrate, visited the ruins of Tikal in 1848 accompanied by Eusebio Lara, who drew some of the monuments there. In 1852 Modesto Méndez went on to discover Stela 1 and Stela 5 at Ixkun. English explorer Alfred Maudslay arrived at Quiriguá in 1881 and cleared the vegetation from the stelae, then travelled on to see the stelae at Copán. In the early 20th century, an expedition by the Carnegie Institution led by American Mayanist Sylvanus Morley discovered a stela at Uaxactun. This period marked a change from the efforts of individual explorers to those of institutions that funded archaeological exploration, excavation and restoration.

Collections

Notable collections of stelae on public display include an impressive series of 8th-century monuments at Quiriguá and 21 stelae collected in the sculpture museum at Tikal National Park, both of which are World Heritage Sites in Guatemala. Calakmul, in Mexico, is another World Heritage site that also includes many stelae regarded as outstanding examples of Maya art. Copán in Honduras, also a World Heritage Site, possesses over 10 finely carved stelae in the site core alone.

The Museo Nacional de Arqueología y Etnología ("National Museum of Archaeology and Ethnology") in Guatemala City displays a number of fine stelae, including three 9th-century stelae from Machaquilá, an 8th-century stela from Naranjo and other stelae from Ixtutz, Kaminaljuyu, La Amelia, Piedras Negras, Seibal, Tikal, Uaxactun and Ucanal. The Museo Nacional de Antropología ("National Museum of Anthropology") in Mexico City has a small number of Maya stelae on display. The San Diego Museum of Man in California contains replicas of the stelae from Quiriguá that were made in 1915 for the Pacific-California Exhibition.

Many Maya archaeological sites have stelae on display in their original locations, in Guatemala these include, but are not limited to, Aguateca, Dos Pilas, El Chal, Ixkun, Nakum, Seibal, Takalik Abaj, Uaxactun, and Yaxha. In Mexico, stelae may be seen at Yaxchilan, and the site museum at Toniná.

Looting
Stelae have become threatened in modern times by plundering for sale on the international art market. Many stelae are found in remote areas and their size and weight prevents them from being removed intact. Various methods are used to cut or break a stela for easier transport, including power saws, chisels, acid and heat. When a monument is well preserved, the looters attempt to cut off its face for transport. Even when successful, this results in damage to inscriptions on the sides of the stela. At worst, this method results in complete fragmentation of the stela face with any recoverable sculpture removed for sale. Traceable fragments of well known monuments have been purchased by American museums and private collectors in the past. When such monuments are removed from their original context, their historical meaning is lost. Although museums have justified their acquisition of stelae fragments with the argument that such objects are better preserved in an institution, no stela has been sold in as good a condition as it was in its original location. After 1970 there was a sharp drop in Maya stelae available on the New York art market due to the ratification of a treaty with Mexico that guarantees the return of stolen pre-Columbian sculpture that was removed from the country after the ratification date. In the early 1970s some museums, such as that of the University of Pennsylvania, responded to international criticism by no longer purchasing archaeological artefacts that lack a legally documented history, including place of origin, previous owners and an export license. Harvard University also instituted a similar policy in the early 1970s.

In 1972, the initially well preserved Stela 5 at Ixkun was smashed into pieces by looters, who heated it until it shattered and then stole various pieces. A number of remaining fragments of the monument were rescued by archaeologist Ian Graham and transferred to the mayor's office in Dolores, Petén, where they were eventually used as construction material before once again being recovered, this time by the Atlas Arqueológico de Guatemala in 1989, and moved to their archaeological laboratory. At the nearby site of Ixtonton,  from Ixkun, most of the stelae were robbed before the site's existence was reported to the Guatemalan authorities. By the time archaeologists visited the site in 1985 only 2 stelae remained.

In 1974, a dealer in pre-Columbian artefacts by the name of Hollinshead arranged for the illegal removal of Machaquilá Stela 2 from the Guatemalan jungle. He and his co-conspirators were prosecuted in the United States under the National Stolen Property Act and they were the first people to be convicted under this act with reference to national patrimony laws. The act states:
"whoever transports, transmits, or transfers in interstate or foreign commerce any goods ... of the value of $5,000 or more, knowing the
same to have been stolen, converted or taken by fraud... [s]hall be fined under this title or imprisoned not more than ten years, or both... "[w]hoever receives, possesses, conceals, stores, barters, sells, or disposes of any goods .. . which have crossed a State or United States boundary after being stolen, unlawfully converted, or taken, knowing the same to have been stolen, unlawfully converted, or taken (is subject to fine or imprisonment)."

The act was originally intended to discourage the handling of stolen property but several courts have judged that the National Stolen Property Act is sufficiently broad in scope to apply to goods crossing into the United States from a foreign nation, and is therefore applicable in the case of stolen cultural property.

Under Guatemalan law, Maya stelae and other archaeological artefacts are property of the Guatemalan government and may not be removed from the country without its permission. In the case of Machaquilá Stela 2, the monument was well known before it was stolen and its illegal removal was easy to prove. The stela itself was cut into pieces, with the face being sawn off and moved to a fish packing factory in Belize, where it was packed into boxes and shipped to California. There it was seized by the Federal Bureau of Investigation after being offered for sale to various institutions. The stolen portion of the stela was returned to Guatemala and is now in storage at the Museo Nacional de Arqueología y Etnología in Guatemala City.

Looting has been linked to the economic and political stability of the possessing nation, with levels of looting increasing during times of crisis. It also appears that art collectors have stelae, or portions of them, stolen to order by browsing archaeological books and catalogues for desirable pieces. Examples of this may be found at Aguateca and El Perú, both in Guatemala's Petén department, where only the better preserved hieroglyphs and human faces were cut away.

List of known Maya stelae by city

See also
 Copán Altar Q
 Olmec colossal heads
 Pascual Abaj
 Potbelly sculpture
 Yaxchilan Lintel 24

Notes

Citations

References

Further reading

 
  

Stelae
 Maya
Maya Classic Period
Mesoamerican stone sculpture
Hardstone carving
History of sculpture
Rock art in North America